Jean Mandel (20 September 1911 – 25 December 1974) was a member of the Bavarian Senate, a football player, and co-founder of the Organization of Jewish Communities in Bavaria.

Early years 
Mandel was born in 1911 in Fürth, where he attended the Jewish high school and afterward a trade school in Nuremberg. He was also a player for SpVgg Greuther Fürth, a career that ended after a severe motorcycle accident. He later worked for a hops distributor. He and his brother began a textile business, which was destroyed in Kristallnacht.

World War II
On 28 October 1938, Mandel was deported to Poland where he settled in Lemberg (now Lviv, Ukraine). In March 1939, he returned for two months to Fürth. During the German occupation of Poland in World War II, Mandel moved among various hiding places in Lviv. When Lviv was captured in 1944 by the Red Army, the Soviet secret police interned Mandel as a suspected Western spy. After a short stay in the DP camp in Zettwitz, Mandel returned to Fürth in the summer of 1945 to rebuild his company. In addition to Rabbi David Spiro, Mandel was the driving force of re-establishing Fürth's Jewish community, whose chairman he remained until his death.

Career
Mandel was also a founding member of the Society for Christian-Jewish Cooperation in Nuremberg and its Jewish chairman. From 1946, he founded the National Association of Jewish Communities in Bavaria and was its vice-president. Between 1957 and 1974 he was chairman of the National Committee. From 1 January 1964 until his death he was a senator in the Bavarian Senate. From 1971, Mandel was a member of the executive board of the Central Council of Jews in Germany.

Mandel died 25 December 1974 and is buried in Fürth's new Jewish Cemetery.

Memorial
On 5 May 2018, Jean Mandel and his brother Leo were honored in Fürth, Germany with the placement of a memorial plate. Their names were inscribed on a plate that is located at Marktplatz 10 on the Green Market and in Königswarterstraße 64. The ceremony was attended by some of the Mandel's remaining family and by the Mayor of Fürth, Thomas Jung.

Awards 
In 1956, Jean Mandel received the Order of Merit of the Federal Republic of Germany.
In 1973, Jean Mandel received the Bavarian Order of Merit.

Literature 
 Helga Schmöger (ed., et al.): Der Bayerische Senat. Biographisch-statistisches Handbuch 1947–1997, Düsseldorf, Droste-Verlag, 1998, p. 216 et seq.

References 
 http://www.nordbayern.de/region/fuerth/zwei-platten-erinnern-an-jean-mandel-1.7593996

Holocaust survivors
Members of the Bavarian Senate
20th-century German people
1911 births
1974 deaths
SpVgg Greuther Fürth players
Officers Crosses of the Order of Merit of the Federal Republic of Germany
German footballers needing infoboxes
Association footballers not categorized by position
Footballers from Bavaria
German footballers